The women's 100 metres at the 2019 World Para Athletics Championships was held in Dubai from 7 to 15 November.

Medalists

See also
List of IPC world records in athletics

References

100 metres
2019 in women's athletics
100 metres at the World Para Athletics Championships